Fritz Peter Buch (21 December 1894 – 6 November 1964) was a German screenwriter and film director. He worked frequently during the Nazi period, but struggled in the post-war years. He directed Zarah Leander in one of her comeback films Cuba Cabana (1952), in what proved to be his final directorial effort.

Selected filmography

Director
 Winter in the Woods (1936)
 Fräulein Veronika (1936)
 The Citadel of Warsaw (1937)
 The Deruga Case (1938)
 Detours to Happiness (1939)
 Menschen im Sturm (1941)
 The Black Robe (1944)
 Cuba Cabana (1952)
 A Very Big Child (1952)

Screenwriter
 Sophienlund (1943)
 Engagement at Wolfgangsee (1956)

References

Bibliography 
 Goble, Alan. The Complete Index to Literary Sources in Film. Walter de Gruyter, 1999.

External links 
 

1894 births
1964 deaths
Film people from Brandenburg
20th-century German screenwriters
German male screenwriters
People from Frankfurt (Oder)
German male writers